Philip Leonardus Walker (29 August 1954 – 7 July 2022) was an English professional footballer who played as a central midfielder. He played for Millwall, Charlton Athletic and Gillingham in the English Football League. After a brief spell with Eastern AA of Hong Kong, he finished his career with eleven years in Portugal with Leixões, Boavista and Maia. His nephew is the Southampton player, Kyle Walker-Peters.

Career
Born in London, Walker joined Millwall in 1975 having played for non-league sides Epsom & Ewell and Cobham prior to that, quickly establishing himself in the centre of the team's midfield. One of the first notable black players in the club's history, he garnered renown as a skilful player with excellent passing; he moved to Charlton Athletic in 1979, and remained there until 1983 when he briefly joined Hong Kong club Eastern AA.

Walker spent half a season with Portuguese club Leixões before moving on at the age of 30 to Boavista. He quickly established himself in the starting eleven, and was a first-choice player for the vast majority of his seven-year spell.

After nearly five seasons with northern neighbours Maia, then playing in the Portuguese Second Division, Walker retired at the age of 41. He subsequently had a brief stint as Maia's coach in the early 2000s.

Later life
Following his retirement, Walker returned to England and set up a soccer school in Wandsworth, London. He died on 8 July 2022.

References

External links

TotalSoccer profile

1954 births
2022 deaths
Footballers from Greater London
English footballers
Association football midfielders
Cobham F.C. players
Epsom & Ewell F.C. players
Millwall F.C. players
Charlton Athletic F.C. players
Gillingham F.C. players
Eastern Sports Club footballers
Leixões S.C. players
Boavista F.C. players
F.C. Maia players
English Football League players
Primeira Liga players
Liga Portugal 2 players
Segunda Divisão players
English expatriate footballers
Expatriate footballers in Hong Kong
Expatriate footballers in Portugal
English expatriate sportspeople in Portugal
Black British sportsmen